Baron Essendon, of Essendon in the County of Hertford, was a title in the Peerage of the United Kingdom. It was created on 20 June 1932 for the shipping magnate Sir Frederick Lewis, 1st Baronet. He had already been created a baronet, of Essendon Place in the County of Hertford, in the Baronetage of the United Kingdom on 11 February 1918. He was succeeded by his only son, the second Baron. He was a well-known motor-racing driver. The titles became extinct on his death on 18 July 1978.

Barons Essendon (1932)
Frederick William Lewis, 1st Baron Essendon (1870–1944)
Brian Edmund Lewis, 2nd Baron Essendon (1903–1978)

References

Extinct baronies in the Peerage of the United Kingdom
Noble titles created in 1932